= Transcendent memory =

Linux kernel feature

Transcedent memory is a Linux kernel feature representing a class of memory that is of unknown and dynamically variable size, addressable only indirectly by the kernel, configured either as persistent or as "ephemeral" (meaning it will be around for a while, but might disappear without warning), and is still fast enough to be synchronously accessible.
